The 1988 Nobel Prize in Literature was awarded to the Egyptian writer Naguib Mahfouz (1911–2006) "who, through works rich in nuance – now clear-sightedly realistic, now evocatively ambiguous – has formed an Arabian narrative art that applies to all mankind." He is the first and only Arabic–Egyptian recipient of the prize.

Laureate

The writings of Naguib Mahfouz address some of life's most important issues, such as the passage of time, society and norms, knowledge and faith, reason and love. Some of his early works are set in ancient Egypt such as Rādūbīs ("Rhadopis of Nubia", 1943), and he frequently uses Cairo as the setting for his tales. His famous Al-Thulāthiyyah ("The Trilogy", 1956–57): Bayn al-qaṣrayn ("Palace Walk", 1956), Qaṣr al-shawq ("Palace of Desire", 1957), and Al-Sukkariyyah ("Sugar Street", 1957), describes prolifically modern Egyptian society. Though some of his later works have a more mystical or metaphysical quality, later works of his focused on the modern age and life in a changing society. 350 short stories and more than 30 novels make up Mahfouz's body of work, among them Awlād ḥāratinā ("Children of Gebelawi", 1959), Tharthara Fawq Al-Nīl ("Adrift on the Nile", 1966), and Afrāḥ al-qubba ("Wedding Song", 1981). Many of his stories have been adapted for film.

Reactions
Widely read in Egypt and other Arabic countries, Mahfouz was largely unknown in the Western world at the time he was awarded the Nobel prize. While Mahfouz was controversial politically, he was a popular writer and the Nobel prize to him was well received throughout the Arab world. The prize was accepted by his two daughters at the award ceremony in Stockholm in December 1988. Mahfouz donated most of the prize money to charities.

References

External links
1988 Press release nobelprize.org
Award ceremony speech nobelprize.org

1988